Nathan Smith (born 21 April 1983) is an Australian former professional rugby league footballer who played in the 2000s and 2010s.

Background
Smith was born in Canberra, ACT, Australia.

Career
He made his first grade debut for Canberra against the North Queensland Cowboys at Canberra Stadium on 10 July 2004.

In his first season at Penrith, Smith played 24 games for the club as they finished last on the table and claimed the wooden spoon.

Smith created headlines in the 2008 NRL season for reneging on a contract with the Canberra Raiders for 2009 and re-signing with Penrith. The Raiders took legal action against Smith and the Panthers for breach of contract, albeit unsuccessfully.

In the 2010 NRL season, Smith played 22 games as Penrith surprised many by finishing second on the table.  Smith played in both finals games which ended in defeat.

In 2016, Smith played for the St Mary's Saints in the Ron Massey Cup and captained the side in their Grand Final defeat by Mounties 36-16.  In 2017, Smith was part of the St Mary's side which won the minor premiership in the Ron Massey Cup.  On 28 August 2017, Smith announced that he would captain the side again in 2018.

References

External links
NRL profile

1983 births
Living people
Australian rugby league players
Canberra Raiders players
Penrith Panthers players
Rugby league centres
Rugby league locks
Rugby league players from Canberra
Windsor Wolves players